Seyssel is a commune in the Ain department in eastern France.

It lies on the west bank of the Rhône.

The part of the town across the Rhône is also named Seyssel but located in the Haute-Savoie department, and is locally referred as Seyssel-Savoie. It is a rare case in France of two homonymous communes adjacent to each other, similar to the situation of the village of Saint-Santin, divided between the communes of Saint-Santin (Aveyron) and Saint-Santin-de-Maurs (Cantal).

Population

See also
Communes of the Ain department

References

Communes of Ain
Ain communes articles needing translation from French Wikipedia